La Fémis (French: École Nationale Supérieure des Métiers de l'Image et du Son; "National Superior School for the Professions of Image and Sound", formerly known as the Institut des hautes études cinématographiques, IDHEC) is a French grande école and the film and television school of PSL Research University.

FEMIS is an acronym for Fondation Européenne pour les Métiers de l'Image et du Son ("European Foundation for the Professions of Image and Sound"). Based in Paris, it offers courses balanced between artistic research, professional development and technical training.

History

From 1944 to 1985, the IDHEC (Institut des hautes études cinématographiques) was the main French film school — training 1,439 French and foreign film professionals.

In 1985, the school was restructured under the supervision of the then Minister of Culture Jack Lang and La Fémis was created in 1986. Originally, scriptwriter Jean-Claude Carrière was its president and Jack Gajos was its director.

When La Fémis was created, the school had seven teaching departments: direction, screenwriting, picture, sound, editing, production, and set design. A script continuity course was added in 1992 and a distribution/exploitation course in 2003. Lastly the master-class workshop, a European production training program, was co-created with the Filmakademie Baden-Württemberg, Ludwigsburg, Germany in 2002. La Fémis is a full member of CILECT, the international network of film schools.

The school is now a public establishment under the responsibility of the Ministry of culture and communication. The school first opened in the Palais de Tokyo (Paris 16e), moving on February 15, 1999, to the old Rapid Film - Pathé Studios at 6, rue Francoeur (18e). Their founder and French prime class producer Bernard Natan was deported by the Nazis in 1942.

In 2019 the French director Michel Hazanivicius was appointed as chairman of the board.

Curriculum

The main curriculum students follow a four-year training course. During the first year, they all follow the same general course: initiation into the various jobs involved in filmmaking, experimenting in every technical position within a film crew.

During the second and third year, they follow a specific curriculum depending on the department they have chosen, including theoretical classes, exercises, days devoted to film analysis, analytical seminars and collective exercises making films. They spend their fourth year fulfilling an individual end-of-studies project (known as "travail de fin d'études" or TFE) and taking part in their classmates' projects.

In sum, the school is designed to foster an applied cinephilia, in which the study of films past and present underwrites advanced skills in the practicalities of filmmaking; returning alumni, like Jean Paul Civeyrac, who come back to themselves lead seminars, carry on this tradition of encouraging advanced auteurist ambitions among the new students.

The school is the subject of a 2016 French film called Le Concours (The Graduation), directed by Claire Simon about the exhaustive application process to be accepted as a student.

Rankings
In 2012, The Hollywood Reporter rated La Fémis no. 6 in its best international film school rankings (it included U.S.-based film schools) and no. 3 in its 2014 best international film school rankings (it excluded U.S.-based film schools). Its alumni have won three of the world's most prestigious film prizes – Cannes Film Festival's Golden Palm, Venice Film Festival's Golden Lion and Berlin International Film Festival's Golden Bear – 11 times, making it the most rewarded film school in the world, preceding the Beijing Film Academy and the Tisch School of the Arts of New York City, in winning those three prizes.

Alumni
La Fémis has trained over 700 students in all filmmaking trades: directors, screenwriters, producers, editors, cameramen, sound engineers, decorators, script supervisors, distributors and exhibition managers/executives.

Among them: 
(in alphabetical order)

Omar Amiralay
Theo Angelopoulos
Jean-Jacques Annaud
Hélène Angel
Solveig Anspach
Emmanuelle Bercot
Yves Boisset
Céline Bozon
Daniel H. Byun
Christine Carrière
Yves Caumont
Alain Cavalier
Renaud Cohen
Henri Colpi
Antony Cordier
Alain Corneau
Jean-Paul Civeyrac
Alfonso Gumucio Dagron
Marina de Van
Claire Denis
Arnaud Desplechin
Julia Ducournau
Robert Enrico
Pascale Ferran
Sophie Fillières
Christophe Gans
Costa Gavras

Delphine Gleize
Marc-Djibril Glissant
Ruy Guerra
Johan van der Keuken
Jean L'Hôte
Patrice Leconte
Paul Leduc
Noémie Lvovsky
Laetitia Masson
Louis Malle
Claude Miller
Orso Miret
Emmanuel Mouret
Léa Mysius
François Ozon
Manuel Pradal
Alain Resnais
Éric Rochant
Paulo Rocha
Am Rong
Claude Sautet
Céline Sciamma
Partho Sen-Gupta
André Téchiné
Eskil Vogt
Hu Wei
Andrzej Żuławski

References

External links
  La Fémis

Film schools in France
Educational institutions established in 1944
Culture of Paris
Education in Paris
Mass media in Paris
1944 establishments in France